Zarok TV (Kurdish: Kid TV) is the first Kurdish satellite television station in Turkey for Kurdish children, broadcasting since 21 March 2015, based in Diyarbakır (Amed). The channel broadcasts programs in various Kurdish languages, specifically Kurmanji, being the most widely spoken Kurdish dialect in Turkey, Zazaki and some Sorani.

Accused of “separatist and subversive” activities, it was shut down on 29 September 2016 under the emergency statutory decree issued during the aftermath of 15 July's failed coup d'état, alongside 12 other television and 11 radio stations, when the police raided the television station's headquarters. Zarok TV's director, said there were no warning before the closure.

In November 2016 the TV station was allowed to broadcast again after much criticism for the sudden closure. The European Parliament condemned the Turkish authorities stating “misusing” law in the aftermath of the unsuccessful coup attempt. Owner of Zarok TV and also several other cultural Kurdish TV channels, estimated the company had lost “125-150 thousand dollars” in October due to closures.

About

The director of Zarok TV stated “It is all about children, the culture, ways of life and language of the Kurds.” in addition mentioned “Cartoons that are watched everywhere in the world, dubbed into Kurdish.”. Zarok means kid/children in Kurdish.

Programming
 Tom & Jerry Kids
 Maya the Bee
 Angelo Rules
 Adventure Time
 Garfield 
 Cédric 
 The Tom and Jerry Show
 The Road Runner Show
 The Smurfs
 Oscar's Oasis 
 Yakari
 The Adventures of Tintin
 Little Hippo
 Chicken Town
 Corneil & Bernie
 Boule et Bill
 My Gym Partner's a Monkey
 64 Zoo Lane
 Uncle Grandpa
 Pablo the Little Red Fox
 Dora Te (Your Turn)
 Hilltop Hospital
 Louie
 Trotro
 Mig Said
 Nîkil&Gewez
 Block 13
 Masî&Kevjal
 Landik
 Morî
 Breadwinners
 The Amazing World of Gumball
 Foster's Home for Imaginary Friends
 Maya the Honey Bee
 SpongeBob SquarePants
 The Angry Beavers
 The Fairly OddParents
 Phineas and Ferb
 Vic The Viking (2013)
 Jurassic World: Camp Cretaceous

See also
 List of Kurdish-language television channels

References

External links
 Official website www.zarok.tv (Also other domains: www.zaroktv.krd or www.zaroktv.com.tr)
 
 
 Zarok TV on YouTube
 Zarok TV on Dailymotion

Kurdish-language television stations
2015 establishments in Turkey
Television channels and stations established in 2015
Television channels and stations disestablished in 2016
Mass media shut down in the 2016 Turkish purges
Defunct television channels in Turkey
Children's television networks
Diyarbakır